The Aragarças Microregion is a geographical division in Goiás state, Brazil.  It consists of 7 municipalities located around Aragarças in western Goiás.

Municipalities 
The microregion consists of the following municipalities:

The most populous municipality is Aragarças with 17,156 inhabitants and the least populous is Diorama with 2,236 inhabitants. The largest municipality in area is Montes Claros de Goiás with 2,909.4 km2 and the smallest is Diorama with 689.6 km2.

See also
List of municipalities in Goiás
Microregions of Goiás

References

Microregions of Goiás